Indo-Surinamese, Indian-Surinamese or Hindustani Surinamese are people of Indian origin who are nationals of Suriname with ancestry from India and the wider subcontinent. Their ancestors were Indian indentured workers brought by the Dutch and the British to the (then) Dutch colony of Suriname during the mid-19th to the early 20th century. Per the 2012 Census of Suriname, 148,443 citizens of Suriname are of Indo-Surinamese origin,  constituting 27.4% of the total population, making them the largest ethnic group in Suriname on an individual level.

Etymology 
Indo-Surinamese are also known locally by the Dutch term  Hindoestanen, derived from the word Hindustani, lit., "someone from Hindustan". Hence, when Indians migrated to Suriname they were referred to as Hindustanis, people of Indian origin. Since 1947 the official name for the ethnic group in Suriname has been Hindostanen (“Hindostanis”). As the term Hindoestanen was mostly associated with followers of Hinduism, Hindostanen also includes the Muslim and Christian followers among the Indian immigrants in Suriname. Nowadays the term Hindoestanen and Hindostanen are interchangeably used in common Dutch language, and with that the meaning of Hindoestanen came to be more inclusive. They were also known as girmityas, a term referring to the Agreements that the labourers had to sign regarding the work and the period of stay, and meaning "Someone with an Agreement."

History

During the British Raj, many Indians were sent to other British colonies for work. After the abolition of slavery in the Dutch colony of Suriname, the Dutch government signed a treaty with the United Kingdom on the recruitment of contract workers. Indians began migrating to Suriname in 1873 from what was then British India as indentured labourers, mostly 75% from the modern-day Indian states of Uttar Pradesh, and in smaller numbers Bihar, Haryana, Punjab and Tamil Nadu. However, among the immigrants there were also labourers from other parts of South Asia, such as Afghanistan and Nepal.

The first ship transporting Indian indentured labourers, the Lalla Rookh, arrived in Paramaribo. Newly freed slaves in Suriname who witnessed Indian workers disembarking at the harbour, reportedly stated, "Jobo tanbasi", meaning "The white man is still the boss", suggesting that they viewed the development as a continuation of the slave trade. Initially, the transport and living conditions of Indian labourers in Suriname was worse than it had been prior to the abolition of the Dutch slave trade. The British Viceroy of India described it as "a new system of slavery". In 1870s, conditions were improved greatly following the passage of new legislation to protect the Indian workers. The Government of the United Kingdom and the colonial British Government in India feared comparisons to slavery would hurt their reputation, and enacted several legislations to make transportation of Indian workers safer and improve working conditions in plantations. The Dutch government, which had signed the agreement to recruit workers with the British after long and difficult negotiations, also feared jeopardizing the arrangement and meticulously followed the regulations imposed by the British. The Dutch were also concerned that they would be accused of reviving the slave trade.

In order to reduce the mortality rate among workers being transported from India, the colonial British government required the presence of at least one doctor on every ship. As regulations required the doctor to be of European-origin, the regulations also required that one Indian indentured labourer be appointed as a translator and that he would be paid for his services at the end of the journey. Other regulations mandated that every ship have distilling apparatus with a capacity to produce at least 500 litres of drinking water from seawater daily, and also required ships to have a sickbay, male and female nursing staff, adequate food and medicine, and artificial ventilation in the passengers' quarters. Another regulation prohibited any ship transporting Indian indentured labourers from setting sail between the end of March and the beginning of August. Any shipping company that violated the regulations would be prohibited from transporting contact workers in the future. While the mortality rate among slaves working on plantations between 1680 and 1807 averaged 50.9 per thousand people, following the passage of the regulations post-1873, it dropped to 7.1 per thousand among Indian workers.

Indo-Surinamese made up 37.6% of the population in the 1972 Census. Following the independence of Suriname on 25 November 1975, a significant portion of the Indo-Surinamese population migrated to the Netherlands, thereby retaining their Dutch passport.

Religion 
The majority religion among the Indo-Surinamese is Hinduism, practiced by 78% of the people, followed by Islam (13%), Christianity (7%), and Jainism. Among the Hindus about 63% follow orthodox, traditional Hinduism that they call Sanātanī to differentiate themselves from the 15% who belong to the reform movement Arya Samaj, started by Dayananda Saraswati. Among the Indo-Surinamese Muslims, 75% follow Sunni Islam while 25% identify as Ahmadiyya, of either the Lahore Ahmadiyya Movement for the Propagation of Islam or the Ahmadiyya Muslim Community community.

Notable Indo-Surinamese people 
 Ashwin Adhin, Surinamese Vice President
 Errol Alibux, politician, former prime minister of Suriname, suspect in the December murders trial
 Robert Ameerali, politician
 Kiran Badloe, windsurfer
 Soerdj Badrising, politician
 Kiran Bechan, football player
 Paul Bhagwandas Military officer, Football Coach, Suspect of December Murder 1982
 George Hindori, Surinamese politician
 Tanja Jadnanansing, Labour Party politician
 Ricardo Kishna, football player
Ismene Krishnadath, writer
 Jagernath Lachmon, politician, ex-Speaker of the National Assembly of Suriname
Vinoodh Matadin, fashion photographer 
 Fred Ramdat Misier, politician
 Sandeep Oemraw, Surinamese tv anchor
 Luciano Narsingh, Dutch footballer
 Prem Radhakishun, lawyer, columnist, actor and radio and television producer.
 Pretaap Radhakishun, former Prime Minister of Suriname
 Anil Ramdas, columnist, correspondent, essayist, journalist, and TV and radio host
 Chan Santokhi, President of Suriname, ex-chief of police, Progressive Reform Party politician
 Ram Sardjoe, politician, ex-Speaker of the National Assembly of Suriname
 Ramsewak Shankar, politician
 Aron Winter, football player
 Anjali Paragsingh, badminton player

See also 

 Arya Samaj in Suriname
 Baithak Gana
 Surinamese Immigrants' Association
 Indians in the Netherlands
 Indo-Caribbean
 Lalla Rookh Museum, a museum about the Indo-Surinamese history and culture
 India–Suriname relations

References

Further reading
 Sandew Hira The legacy of 135 years of Indian Immigration in Suriname
 Indian Diaspora in Suriname 
 Indian Diaspora in Netherlands

Ethnic groups in Suriname
 
 
Indo-Caribbean